United is an album led by trumpeter Woody Shaw which was recorded in 1981 and released on the Columbia label.

Reception

Scott Yanow of Allmusic stated, "Of Woody Shaw's five Columbia albums, United is the one that sounds most like a blowing session... this fairly straight-ahead and accessible yet adventurous date. Worth searching for".

Track listing 
All compositions by Woody Shaw except as indicated
 "United" (Wayne Shorter) - 5:20
 "The Greene Street Caper" - 5:29
 "What Is This Thing Called Love?" (Cole Porter) - 9:40
 "Pressing the Issue" (Mulgrew Miller) - 7:04
 "Katrina Ballerina" - 5:39
 "Blues for Wood" (Ronnie Mathews, Woody Shaw) - 7:17  
Recorded at Right Track Studios in New York City on March 7 (tracks 1, 4 & 5), March 9 (track 2) and March 17 (tracks 3 & 6), 1981
United was reissued on Woody Shaw: The Complete Columbia Albums Collection in 2011.

Personnel 
Woody Shaw - trumpet, flugelhorn
Steve Turre - trombone
Mulgrew Miller - piano 
Stafford James - bass
Tony Reedus - drums
Gary Bartz - alto saxophone (tracks 3 & 6)

References 

Woody Shaw albums
1981 albums
Columbia Records albums
Albums produced by Michael Cuscuna